All Aboard the Blue Train is a compilation album by American singer-songwriter Johnny Cash. It was released on December 3, 1962, by Sun Records after Cash had left the label and signed with Columbia Records. The album is made up of songs Cash recorded for Sun prior to leaving the label. The album was re-issued in 2003 Varèse Sarabande, with six bonus tracks.

Track listing

References

1962 albums
Johnny Cash albums
Fiction about rail transport
Albums produced by Sam Phillips
Sun Records albums
Varèse Sarabande albums
Albums recorded at Sun Studio
Albums produced by Jack Clement
Albums about trains